Julián Andres Cruz Sánchez  (born February 15, 1987) is a Colombian footballer who currently plays for ADI F.C. in El Salvador.

External links
  Profile - El Gráfico

1987 births
Living people
Association football forwards
Colombian footballers
Millonarios F.C. players
Atlético Balboa footballers
Colombian expatriate footballers
Expatriate footballers in El Salvador
People from Popayán
Sportspeople from Cauca Department